U.S. Route 58 Alternate (US 58 Alt.) is a  alternate route to US 58 in western Virginia. The route is a northern bypass to US 58 which stays closer to the Tennessee border and serves Gate City and Bristol.

Route description

Jonesville to Norton

US 58 Alt. begins at the intersection of Main Street and Park Street in the center of the town of Jonesville, the county seat of Lee County. US 58 heads west along Main Street and south along Park Street, then east along Wilderness Road. US 58 Alt. heads east along two-lane Main Street, then north along the Trail of the Lonesome Pine to exit the town. The highway expands to a four-lane divided highway north of the town limits, then curves east. US 58 Alt. temporarily becomes undivided through Ben Hur, where the highway begins to parallel CSX's Cumberland Valley Subdivision rail line. The highway drops to two lanes and crosses over the rail line as it enters the town of Pennington Gap. US 58 Alt. follows Morgan Avenue through the town, where it briefly runs concurrently with US 421 between Doris Avenue and Woodway Road.

US 58 Alt. expands to a four-lane divided highway again as it exits Pennington Gap. The highway crosses over the railroad again at the west end of Dryden and leaves the railroad as the U.S. Highway crosses the Powell River. US 58 Alt. returns to the vicinity of the river and railroad and enters Wise County, where its name becomes Pennington Gap Highway, just west of Big Stone Gap. The highway reduces to two lanes and enters the town as Cumberland Avenue, then veers onto Wood Avenue, which passes the Southwest Virginia Museum. In the center of town, US 58 Alt. turns south onto Fifth Street, which carries U.S. Route 23 Business (US 23 Bus.). The U.S. Highway special routes turn east onto Gilley Avenue to leave the town. The road expands to a four-lane divided highway shortly before a four-ramp partial cloverleaf interchange with US 23 (Orby Cantrell Highway) north of the campus of Mountain Empire Community College. US 23 Bus. ends at the interchange while US 58 Alt. joins the US 23 divided highway.

US 58 Alt. and US 23 cross over Norfolk Southern Railway's Appalachia District rail line, have a diamond interchange with SR 610 (Powell Valley Road), then follow the southern flank of Little Stone Mountain. The highway veers north to cross the mountain at Little Stone Gap, then curves back east again and enters the independent city of Norton. The highways have a four-ramp partial cloverleaf interchange with 12th Street, which forms part of US 58 Alt. Bus., while bypassing downtown Norton to the south. US 58 Alt. and US 23 cross over SR 74, Norfolk Southern's Clinch Valley District rail line, and the Guest River before reaching the partial cloverleaf interchange where the highways diverge. US 23 continues north toward Wise and US 58 Alt. exits onto Norton Coeburn Road; the portion of that road west of the interchange is the eastern end of US 58 Alt. Bus., which is also SR 283 at its eastern end.

Norton to Abingdon
US 58 Alt. heads east along four-lane divided Norton Coeburn Road. The highway leaves the city of Norton and re-enters Wise County at its junction with SR 74 (Kentucky Avenue). US 58 Alt. parallels the rail line and the Guest River through the community of Tacoma on its way to the town of Coeburn, where the highway diverges from the river. At the west end of town, the highway has a westbound right-in/right-out interchange with SR 158 (Front Street) and an eastbound interchange with Trail of the Lonesome Pine, which leads to SR 158. Further east, US 58 Alt. has a diamond interchange with SR 72. The highway meets the eastern end of SR 158 at Banner, then continues southeast as Bull Run Road toward the town of St. Paul. Within the town, US 58 Alt. passes under the Clinch Valley District rail line and briefly cuts through a strip of Russell County, within which the highway intersects SR 63 (Wise Street). The alternate route returns to Wise County as Castlewood Drive, crosses over CSX's Kingsport Subdivision, and meets the southern end of SR 270 (Fourth Street). US 58 Alt. then crosses the Clinch River into Russell County and leaves the town of St. Paul.

US 58 Alt. continues as Trail of the Lonesome Pine along the south and west side of the unincorporated community of Castlewood and meets the northern end of SR 65 at Banners Corner. The alternate route runs concurrently with SR 71 between the hamlets of Parsonage and Dickensonville. US 58 Alt. heads south to the hamlet of Bolton, then turns east and meets US 19 at Hansonville. The two highways head southeast and cross Clinch Mountain at Little Moccasin Gap. US 58 Alt. and US 19 continue into Washington County as Porterfield Highway. US 58 Alt. and US 19 cross the North Fork of the Holston River at Holston and continue together to the town of Abingdon, where US 58 Alt. splits east onto two-lane Russell Road, which passes to the north of the William King Museum. In downtown Abingdon, US 58 Alt. briefly runs concurrently with US 11 east along Main Street, then turns south onto four-lane Cummings Street, which also carries SR 75. The highways cross over Norfolk Southern's Pulaski District rail line and head south a diamond interchange with I-81 and US 58 that serves as the eastern terminus of US 58 Alt. SR 75 continues south toward Green Spring.

Major intersections

See also

Special routes of U.S. Route 58

References

External links

 Virginia Highways Project: US 58 ALT

58 Alternate
U.S. Route 058 Alternate
U.S. Route 058 Alternate
U.S. Route 058 Alternate
U.S. Route 058 Alternate
U.S. Route 058 Alternate
58 Alternate
Alternate